Head on Comedy was a comedy debate show hosted by Jo Brand in which two teams of three, captained by Bill Bailey and Ed Byrne, would debate trivial topics such as 'This house wants to be a man'. It ran for one series, consisting of six episodes.

Episodes

Reception
The show received mixed reviews. Robert Hanks, writing in The Independent was strongly critical, concluding that it "is less Head On than Television Off". Paul Hoggart from The Times was more positive, acknowledging that it was "frayed round the edges", but that it "had its surreal and surprising moments".

References

External links

BFI Film & Television Database

BBC television comedy
2000 British television series debuts
2000 British television series endings
2000s British comedy television series
Debate television series